This page lists the World Best Year Performance in the year 1998 in both the men's and the women's race walking distances: 20 km and 50 km (outdoor). One of the main events during this season were the 1998 European Athletics Championships in Budapest, Hungary.

Abbreviations
All times shown are in hours:minutes:seconds

Men's 20 km

Records

1998 World Year Ranking

Men's 50 km

Records

1998 World Year Ranking

Women's 10 km

Records

1998 World Year Ranking

Women's 20 km

Records

1998 World Year Ranking

References
marciaitaliana
IAAF

1998
Race Walking Year Ranking, 1998